Torrellano Club de Fútbol was a Spanish football team based in Torrellano (es), Elche, in the Valencian Community. Founded in 1983 it was dissolved 26 years later, and held home matches at Estadio Municipal de Torrellano, with a capacity of 2,000 spectators.

History
Founded in 1983, Torrellano spent the first sixteen years of its existence competing in the regional leagues. In 2000 it first reached Tercera División, lasting five seasons.

In the 2009 summer the club merged with CD Illice, creating Torrellano Illice CF.

Season to season

5 seasons in Tercera División

References

External links
AREFEpedia profile 

Defunct football clubs in the Valencian Community
Sport in Elche
Association football clubs established in 1984
Association football clubs disestablished in 2009
1984 establishments in Spain
2009 disestablishments in Spain